John Hastings Turner (16 December 1892 - 29 February 1956), frequently referred to as Hastings Turner or J. Hastings Turner, was an English novelist, dramatist and theatre director. His works were filmed and performed on stage and in film in Britain and the United States from the 1920s to the 1940s.

Biography
Turner married the Scottish silent film actress, Laura Cowie, on 20 June 1918. They later settled in Blue Tiles Farm near Fakenham, Norfolk.

During the First World War Turner wrote three plays: Nothing New, Peace Time Prophecies or Stories Gone Wrong and Tails Up. An early published novel of his from 1919, Simple Souls, was made into a movie in 1920 with a scenario by Fred Myton, directed by the American Robert Thornby. In 1926, Turner's play The Scarlet Lady, a comedy, opened at the Criterion Theatre in London, starring Marie Tempest, a friend and the driving force behind the establishment of the actors' union Equity. Supporting Tempest was an ingénue, Fabia Drake, who became Tempest's firm confidante and then Turner's sister-in-law through marriage to his barrister brother, Maxwell Turner.
His comedy, The Spot on the Sun, played in Australia in 1931.

Thereafter, in addition to his solo work, Turner collaborated with other writers, notably Roland Pertwee, with whom he wrote plays, scenarios or dialogues for a number of productions in the early 1930s, including a series of movies directed by John Daumery and William C. McGann, and Irving Asher's now-lost 1935 U.K. production Murder at Monte Carlo directed by Michael Barringer and starring Errol Flynn in his first major role. Turner's work was performed by other leading actors including Margot Grahame (A Letter of Warning, 1932), Nora Swinburne (A Voice Said Goodnight, 1932, Cedric Hardwicke, Boris Karloff and Ralph Richardson (The Ghoul, 1933), and Jane Baxter (The Night of the Party, 1935, directed by Michael Powell.

From the late 1930s, Turner did some writing - and Cowie occasional acting - for productions by The Rank Organisation, which had bought film studios like Gaumont-British that Turner had previously worked for.

Turner died at home in Norfolk in 1956, at the age of 63.

References

1892 births
1956 deaths
20th-century British dramatists and playwrights
English male novelists
20th-century British novelists
English film directors
20th-century English male writers